Shigeri (written: 繁理 or しげり in hiragana) is a unisex Japanese given name. Notable people with the name include:

Shigeri Akabane (1941–2001), Japanese professional midget wrestler
, Japanese footballer
, Japanese journalist and feminist

Japanese unisex given names